Spiral (Rita Wayword) is a character appearing in American comic books published by Marvel Comics. Created by writer Ann Nocenti and artist Art Adams, the character first appeared in Longshot #1 (September 1985). She was established as a lieutenant for that titular character's archenemy, Mojo. Prior to Longshot joining the X-Men, Spiral also became a recurring adversary of that team and each of the various X-Men subgroups, as well as serving as the archenemy turned ally of X-Men member Psylocke. She then joined a team of X-Force led by X-Men member Storm.

Publication history
Spiral first appeared in issue #1 of the 1985 Longshot miniseries by Ann Nocenti and Art Adams (though her alter ego Ricochet Rita did not debut until the second issue of the series), and subsequently appeared 2 months later as a member of Mystique's Freedom Force team in Uncanny X-Men #199. Spiral began as one of 20 minor characters that Adams designed on a character sheet as the pursuers of the character Longshot. Her six arms were inspired by deities in Hindu mythology. Although Adams gave little thought to Spiral, as he had developed ideas for the other characters he had drawn on the sheet, Nocenti decided to make her a major character, and gave her the name Spiral. The character sheet is reproduced in the back of the X-Men: Longshot hardcover collection.

In the final issue of the limited series, Spiral is hinted to be a former lover of Longshot. Chris Claremont portrayed her as having a pathological hatred for Longshot, and implied that the two were former lovers during a hallucinatory dream sequence in Uncanny X-Men #248.

As originally conceived, Spiral and Ricochet Rita were two separate entities. When the character was co-opted by Claremont for use in the pages of Uncanny X-Men, this was continued with Rita appearing in the pages of Excalibur: Mojo Mayhem and Uncanny X-Men Annual #12 as a prisoner of Mojo.

In X-Factor Annual #7, writer Fabian Nicieza established that Rita and Spiral were the same person, and that her hatred for Longshot was driven by her desire for revenge from being taken prisoner, driven insane, and physically modified by Mojo and his chief scientist Arize. It also stated that after turning her into Spiral (an event that will take place at some point in the future), Mojo sent her back to the past to serve his past self and set forth the chain of events that will lead to Rita becoming Spiral.

Fictional character biography

Spiral's real name is Rita Wayword, better known as 'Ricochet Rita'. She was a professional stuntwoman who befriended Longshot when he first appeared on Earth. Rita was attacked by her evil, future self which led to her meeting Longshot and falling in love with him. When Longshot sought to return to his home dimension, the Mojoverse, the lovestruck Rita went with him, only to watch Longshot fail and be captured by the dimension's evil overlord, Mojo. Longshot was promptly mindwiped to forget all about Rita, while a much worse fate was left for her.

Becoming Spiral
After holding her prisoner for several years (at which point Rita was made to serve as guardian for Mojo's army of "X-Babies"), Mojo forced his chief scientist, Arize, to perform extreme physical and mental modifications on Rita to recreate her as a loyal subordinate. These experiments left her with six arms (two of which were robotic), turned her hair white, and drove the young woman insane through forcibly evolving Rita's mind to the point that she could see into other dimensions that were used for time-travel/teleportation. He also trained her in the dark arts of magic and body modification, so that she could use these skills to mutilate others as Mojo had mutilated her. Finally, in a cruel act of manipulation, Mojo sent Spiral back in time to set into motion the events that led to her former self becoming Mojo's prisoner and become Spiral by attacking her past self.

Freedom Force
In the past, Spiral found herself stranded on Earth by Mojo for failing to kill Longshot and Rita. At some unknown point, Spiral encountered Val Cooper and was recruited into Freedom Force, a revamped version of the second Brotherhood of Mutants. Despite being utterly insane and more blood-thirsty than her new teammates, Spiral quickly became a valuable member of the team, singlehandedly defeating the X-Men on several occasions as well as kidnapping the X-Man Rachel Summers for Mojo. She was also instrumental in Freedom Force's victory over the Avengers and the West Coast Avengers when sent by the U.S. government to arrest the heroes. Her magical powers temporarily robbed Captain Marvel of her energy powers and she also defeated Iron Man, removing two of the most powerful Avengers from the battle.

Body Shoppe
She also ran the "Body Shoppe", which sells alien cybernetic parts to amputees and others who seek the power of cybernetic limbs. Most notably, Spiral transformed Lady Deathstrike into a cyborg; upgraded the cyborgs Cole, Macon, and Reece originally created by Donald Pierce; and installed the cybernetic eyes in Betsy Braddock's original body, which doubled as cameras for Mojo to spy on the X-Men.

Psylocke's transformation

Along with Mojo, Spiral was shown to have played a role in Betsy Braddock's physical appearance changing from that of a purple-haired Anglo-Saxon to an East Asian. Originally, it was believed that the two literally transformed Braddock's original European body to an Asian one, but it was revealed that Spiral (without Mojo's involvement) transferred the X-Man's mind into the body of the Japanese assassin Kwannon. She also merged the two women's minds and genetic structures, giving each of them personality traits and physical characteristics of the other, as well as halving Psylocke's telepathy between them. This led to much confusion as to which of the two was the real Elizabeth Braddock when Revanche first appeared. Other than malicious intent, Spiral's reasons for doing this (if any) are still unknown.

Even though she was a loyal servant of Mojo, Spiral deeply resented Mojo's crass manners and cruelty towards her. In particular, Spiral has been known to go against Mojo's orders and attack Longshot out of a psychotic need for revenge for Longshot's seduction of her and how her love for him led to her transformation into the being she is today. As such, Mojo has been known to leave Spiral stranded on Earth without her power, which she needs to travel safely between dimensions.

Crimson Dawn and Viper
The Dragons of the Crimson Dawn, a group of monks with ties to the Crimson Dawn, managed to journey to the Wildways, another Magical dimension and the home of Spiral when not serving Mojo. They needed the woman to help them teleport to Earth, but when Spiral refused to aid them, she was threatened with torture that was even beyond her Body Shoppe’s capabilities and she reluctantly accepted to join them and received the mark of the Crimson Dawn. Actually Spiral thought she could outsmart the Dragons at one point, but the Crimson Dawn’s influence was too strong and she had no choice but to release them on Earth, namely in London, where they attacked by surprise Psylocke's twin brother, Captain Britain. They took him prisoner to their native Hong Kong, where they wanted to channel his powers into breaching the dimensional wall to the Crimson Dawn, thus enslaving Earth.

Spiral alerted Excalibur to the Dragons' plan, and despite the team's initial distrust, teleported the team to Hong Kong. Another entity trying to spoil the plan was Xiandu's spirit, who told Meggan, the only one to sense him, that like him the Dragons of the Crimson Dawn were from the time China was overrun by the barbarian Li-Tzu Ch'eng. They had prayed that the kingdom would be spared the endless bloodshed, but the Ming dynasty ended anyway. Frustrated that their prayers hadn’t been answered, Xiandu and three of his friends, Ra'al, Barak and A'yin, went down the darkest road they would ever travel. In the pitch of night they were initiated into a covenant that promised to repel China’s oppressors. Xiandu underestimated the might of the Crimson Dawn, and only learned that his friends had been corrupted by it in the night they killed him. In the instant his life ended, Barak, A'yin and Ra'al found themselves transformed into the Dragons of the Crimson Dawn. Xiandu's spirit remained on Earth, wandering around to await their inevitable escape from the Crimson realm. The spirit revealed to Meggan that not only her abilities but also her love for Brian was needed to rescue him and stop the two worlds from merging into one. While the rest of Excalibur temporarily held the Dragons of the Crimson Dawn at bay, Meggan helped Brian redirect the power flow, releasing it safely into the atmosphere. While Brian survived, he was Captain Britain no more, his powers gone. The Dragons left by melting into the shadows, vowing that one day they would succeed and rule Earth.

Spiral then returned to the Wildways and Mojo, who purged her of all traces of the Crimson Dawn's influence over her. She then was sent to help the terrorist known as the Viper, who had acquired the long missing younger siblings of the New Mutant Karma and sought Spiral's help in modifying them so as to serve as minions of the villainess. The plan would fail when Spiral and Viper sent the two modified children to attack the X-Men. Beast and Cannonball defeated Spiral and Viper and Spiral was forced to restore the children.

"House of M"
Just prior to the "House of M" storyline, Spiral and Mojo attacked the X-Men during a training session in the Danger Room. Spiral transforms most of the X-Men into their X-Baby forms, but is unable to do the same to Psylocke due to their connection. Spiral is however able to paralyze Betsy and conjure a gag for her, and later uses her abilities to torment the mutant before the X-Babies defeat Mojo and return to their normal states. After this, Emma Frost claims that she intends to use her powers to ensure that Mojo and Spiral will never be able to bother the X-Men again, though it would seem this threat was never carried out.

"The Apocalypse"
In the X-Force: Shatterstar miniseries, Spiral is revealed to have conquered an alternate timeline and referred to herself as "The Apocalypse". She managed to kill most of that Earth's heroes, and only Cable and some of his X-Force/New Mutants allies were left. Spiral had kidnapped that universe's Sunspot and tortured him by making him make love to her until his rescue. It is implied that, with the aid of Shatterstar, Spiral was defeated and returned to Mojo's services. She later attacked the X-Men together with Mojo, but ended up defeated once again.

"Endangered Species"
Spiral was among the nine criminal geniuses whom Beast seeks out when it comes to reversing the effects of the 2005 storyline "Decimation". Mojo himself was another.

Later, Spiral teleported to Beast, claiming that Mojo was displeased with the fact mutants are now an endangered species and, while Beast asked for her help, her boss Mojo demanded it. Spiral commented that science was blinding him to find the real solution to answer how to save mutantkind. Spiral tells him that energy dances its way through everything, keeping her out, that it is beyond anything her Body Shoppe can simply fix, and that the death of mutants was not caused by science, and it would not be saved by science.

Her last comments before teleporting away were: "Put aside what you know. For where science ends... magic begins".

The Sisterhood of Mutants
While repairing Lady Deathstrike after the events of Messiah Complex, Spiral is approached by the Red Queen and agrees to join her Sisterhood of Mutants.

After a brief confrontation with Domino, the Sisterhood steal Kwannon's corpse from her grave in Tokyo. Madelyne performs a ceremony with Spiral's assistance, transferring the soul of the kidnapped Psylocke back into her original body. Later the Sisterhood take on the X-Men. Spiral seriously injures Nightcrawler and Colossus while the Red Queen goes and fetches a lock of Jean Grey's hair from Wolverine's room before teleporting the Sisterhood back to base.

Back at base, the Sisterhood split up, leaving the Mastermind sisters and Psylocke behind while Spiral and the rest of the Sisterhood go to Jean Grey's burial site. Spiral takes on Northstar and when Pryor is defeated, Spiral grabs the rest of the Sisterhood—Lady Deathstrike, Chimera, Lady Mastermind and Martinique Jason—and escapes with them.

Uncanny X-Force

At some point, Spiral was exiled back to Earth by Mojo. For reasons yet to be revealed, Mojo opted to further punish Spiral by way of removing her ability to teleport through dimensions. Furious, Spiral set up shop in Los Angeles where she took in a homeless girl who happened to be a new mutant. She then joined Storm’s incarnation of X-Force and became a superhero.

Powers and abilities
Spiral has powerful mystical abilities. When Spiral was first introduced, she was a powerful sorceress and during her first two encounters with the X-Men, singlehandedly defeated the team. She can cast spells to stun, depower, or immobilize her superhuman opponents, as she did to depower and imprison the Avengers and West Coast Avengers once they were lying still long enough for the spells to catch them. In New Avengers #53, she was revealed by the Eye of Agamotto as one of several magic-users with the potential to be the next Sorcerer Supreme after Doctor Strange. Spiral's spellcasting powers can be triggered through small gestures of her many hands. With the gestures, she can teleport herself and numerous people across great distances. More powerful spells require more complicated dance moves.  Spiral can open gateways between dimensions and travel through time, although it has been implied that she sometimes requires Mojo's help to successfully teleport from one dimension to another. At other times, she has independently traversed dimensions and centuries of time, and set herself slightly out of phase with the timestream so as to avoid blows. Spiral often incorporates knives and swords into more complicated spells. Spiral can also disguise herself through her magic.

Spiral's mind is apparently immune to possession. When Rogue attempted to use her power-and-psyche-stealing ability to steal Spiral's mind and powers, Spiral stole Rogue's instead, laughing that she had danced in many people's souls. Nocturne was fooled by Spiral into thinking Spiral had been possessed while Spiral remained in control.

According to Mystique, Spiral is aware whenever a person speaks her name by the usage of "quasi-sentient sensors", which even filters out mundane uses of the word "spiral".<ref>Wolverine Vol. #2. Issue #51. Marvel Comics.</ref> As a result of being cybernetically enhanced on Mojo-world, she has some limited level of superhuman physical attributes.

Spiral is a highly skilled hand-to-hand combatant, acrobat, and sword fighter. Her six arms are fully coordinated, giving her great dexterity and athletic ability. Spiral demonstrated highly developed skills in cybernetics and genetic manipulation which she has used to turn humans into powerful cyborgs at her Body Shoppe. The most notable include Lady Deathstrike and the cybernetic Reavers, who have since been "upgraded" by Donald Pierce.

 Reception 

 Accolades 

 In 2019, CBR.com ranked Spiral 17th in their "21 Most Powerful Sorcerer Supreme Candidates" list.
 In 2020, Scary Mommy included Spiral in their "Looking For A Role Model? These 195+ Marvel Female Characters Are Truly Heroic" list.

Other versions
Ultimate Marvel

In the Ultimate Marvel universe, Spiral is a citizen of the apartheid state of Genosha and the on-and-off girlfriend of Longshot. She differs from the mainstream continuity because she is not a villain and has no magical abilities, being a mutant instead. She does, however, possess incredible physical combat abilities, using a multitude of weapons utilizing her six arms. She was in love with Longshot, but betrayed him when having an affair with a human mutant-sponsor named Lord Scheele. When Longshot found out he killed the man in a fit of rage, and Spiral knocked him out. She confronted the Ultimate X-Men about it when they came to Genosha to investigate, and with the aid of Jean Grey's telepathic powers, Longshot's guilt was proven. The X-Men later enabled Spiral to emigrate to the USA and join her sister, also a mutant. In Ultimate Comics: X-Men #33, a six-armed mutant is seen falling from the floating city of Tian, but it is unknown if this is Spiral.

Old Man Logan
In the pages of Old Man Logan, the elderly Logan had awoken on Earth-616 and had a flashback to where Spiral, Red Skull, Baron Blood, Count Nefaria, and Whirlwind were standing over the dead bodies of the superheroes the day when the villains rose and the heroes fell.

In other media

Television
 Spiral appears in X-Men: The Animated Series, voiced by Cynthia Belliveau. This version temporarily betrays Mojo after falling in love with Longshot.
 Spiral appears in the Wolverine and the X-Men episode "X-Calibre", voiced by Grey DeLisle. This version is the leader of Mojo's Reavers.

Video games
 Spiral appears as a playable character in X-Men: Children of the Atom, voiced by Catherine Disher.
 Spiral appears as a playable character in Marvel vs. Capcom 2, voiced again by Catherine Disher.
 Spiral appears in X-Men: Mojo World.
 Spiral appears in Viewtiful Joe's ending in Marvel vs. Capcom 3: Fate of Two Worlds. This version works as a producer for a police procedural that Joe is starring in.
 Spiral appears as an lockable character in Marvel: Avengers Alliance''.

References

External links
 Swords, Spells, & Slavery: The Saga of Spiral at UncannyXmen.net
 

Characters created by Ann Nocenti
Characters created by Art Adams
Comics characters introduced in 1985
Fictional female assassins
Fictional geneticists
Fictional roboticists
Fictional engineers
Fictional characters from parallel universes
Fictional stunt performers
Fictional assassins in comics
Fictional swordfighters in comics
Genoshans
Marvel Comics characters who can teleport
Marvel Comics characters who use magic
Marvel Comics characters with superhuman strength
Marvel Comics female supervillains
Marvel Comics martial artists
Marvel Comics mutants
Marvel Comics mutates
Marvel Comics scientists
Marvel Comics female superheroes